Myriam Isabel Palacios Piña (18 December 1936 – 18 March 2013) was a Chilean actress and comedian who worked in theater, film, and television. She was the winner of two  Awards for her theater performances.

Biography
The daughter of Héctor Palacios and Isabel Piña, Myriam Palacios was born in the district of Victoria, Araucanía Region.

Her theatrical training took place at the University Theater of Concepción and the Theater School of the University of Chile (1960). She participated in the play , directed by Raúl Osorio, which was very successful and was performed in several cities in Latin America and Europe.

She made her film debut in 1988, when she played Laura in Gonzalo Justiniano's . She also acted in Caluga o menta (1990), Amnesia (1994), The Sentimental Teaser (1999), and Coronation (2000) – for which she would receive an Altazor Award nomination – among others.

Toward the end of her life she suffered from Alzheimer's disease and lived in a nursing home for six years. She died on 18 March 2013 at age 76.

Filmography

Film
 El 18 de los García (1983) as Clementina
  (1987) as Nelida
  (1988) as Eloisa
  (1988) as Ursulina
 Caluga o menta (1990) as Sra de clase alta
 Dos mujeres en la ciudad (1990) as Altagracia
 La niña en la palomera (1991) as Inés
 The Shipwrecked (1994)
 Amnesia (1994)
 Pasión gitana (1997)
 The Sentimental Teaser (1999)
 Coronation (2000)
 Las golondrinas de Altazor (2006) as seamstress; her last role

Television

Telenovelas and series

Other programs
 De chincol a jote

References

External links
 

1936 births
2013 deaths
20th-century Chilean actresses
21st-century Chilean actresses
Chilean film actresses
Chilean stage actresses
Chilean telenovela actresses
Chilean women comedians
Deaths from dementia in Chile
Deaths from Alzheimer's disease
People from Victoria, Chile
University of Chile alumni